Mountain Ridge High School is a public high school in Glendale, Arizona, United States, a suburb of Phoenix. The school opened in fall 1995. The school had a 95% graduation rate in 2015.  Mountain Ridge is part of the Deer Valley Unified School District.

Athletics
Athletic Motto- “The Ridge Way”

Fall Sports
 Badminton
 Cross Country
 Football
 Golf
 Girls Volleyball
 Swim & Dive
Winter Sports
 Basketball
 Soccer
 Wrestling
Spring Sports
 Baseball
 Beach Volleyball
 Boys Volleyball
 Softball
 Tennis
 Track & Field

State Championships 
 AIA Directors Cup 2022 for outstanding overall Athletic Department
 Pride of the West (Marching Band) won the 2019 Arizona Band and Orchestra Directors Association (ABODA) State Marching Band Championships
 Pride of the West won the 2019 Arizona Marching Band Association (AzMBA) Class 4A State Championships
 Lacrosse won the 2017 Division II Boys State Title.
 Mock Trial won the 2001 Arizona State Championship (National 4th place)
 Mock Trial won the 2013 Arizona State Championship

Enrollment
In the 2014–15 school year, Mountain Ridge High School had an enrollment of 2,206 students. The student population was 75% White, with 12% Hispanic and Latino Americans.

Notable alumni
 Nate Adams (2002), motocross rider and extreme sports athlete
 Eddie Bonine (1999), former MLB pitcher for the Detroit Tigers
 Jade Carey (2018), gymnast, 2020 Olympic champion, 7x World medalist
 Chris Duffy (1998), former MLB outfielder for the Pittsburgh Pirates
 Richie Incognito (2001), football player with the Buffalo Bills
 Giselle Juarez (2016), softball player
 Matthew Liberatore (2018), baseball player with the St. Louis Cardinals
 Jeff Locke (2008), former football punter (Minnesota Vikings, Detroit Lions, San Francisco 49ers)
 Parker Markel (2009), baseball player with the Seattle Mariners
 Travis Peterson (2004), professional basketball player in European leagues
 Allysa Seely (2007), paratriathlete, gold medalist at the 2016 and 2020 Summer Paralympics
 Jon Weeks (2004), football player with the Houston Texans

References

External links
 Mountain Ridge High School
 Mountain Ridge Athletics
 Mountain Ridge Lacrosse
 The Ridge Review

Public high schools in Arizona
Educational institutions established in 1995
Schools in Maricopa County, Arizona
1995 establishments in Arizona